Laurent Franco Ciman (born 5 August 1985) is a Belgian former professional footballer who played as a defender. He currently serves as an assistant coach for CF Montréal in Major League Soccer.

Club career

Charleroi

Ciman began his career in the youth system of Charleroi and made his first team debut in 2004. His play with Charleroi attracted the interest of the top Belgian clubs.

Club Brugge
Ciman was transferred from Charleroi to Club Brugge in June 2008 and signed a three-year contract for the Belgian team, he was loaned to Kortrijk for the 2009–10 season.

Standard Liège
On 16 June 2010, he joined Standard Liège on a four-year contract. Upon joining Standard, Ciman established him as a starter and helped the club capture the 2010–11 Belgian Cup. He made 194 appearances for the club, scoring eight goals, before leaving the club in the winter of 2015.

Montreal Impact

Ciman signed a three-year deal with Major League Soccer club Montreal Impact on 22 January 2015. In his first season with the team, he was named MLS Defender of the Year. In July 2016, he was included in the roster for the 2016 MLS All-Star Game.

LAFC
On 12 December 2017, Ciman was traded to MLS expansion side Los Angeles FC in exchange for Raheem Edwards and Jukka Raitala. On April 29, 2018 Ciman scored the first goal in LAFCs newly opened Banc of California Stadium on a free kick in the 93rd minute.

Dijon
On 28 August 2018, Ciman joined Ligue 1 club Dijon FCO on a two-year contract. The transfer fee paid to LAFC was reported as $500,000. Just 4 months later, Ciman had his contract at Dijon terminated by mutual consent.

Toronto FC

On 27 December 2018, he returned to MLS, signing with Toronto FC. Following the 2020 season, Toronto chose not to renew his contract.

International career

Ciman was a member of the Belgium squad which came fourth at the 2008 Olympics.

Ciman also played for the National U21 side and was called up by national coach Georges Leekens for the friendly match against Bulgaria on 19 May 2010, during which he made his debut.

On 13 May 2014, Ciman was named in Belgium's squad for the 2014 World Cup. He was unused in the tournament, in which Belgium reached the quarter-finals. In the next major tournament, UEFA Euro 2016 he was also part of the squad. This time, he played in the opening game of the competition, a 2–0 defeat to Italy.

In May 2018, he was named as an alternate for Belgium’s squad for the 2018 World Cup in Russia.

Coaching career 
On February 24, 2021 CF Montréal announced Ciman as a new assistant coach for the club.

Personal 
Ciman is married to Diana and has two children, a daughter named Nina and a son named Achille. His daughter has autism, and he moved to Montreal in 2015, as the city had better supports for his daughter than his native Belgium. He continued to live in the city even while playing for Toronto. In 2020, Ciman obtained Canadian Permanent Residency status, allowing him to be counted as a domestic player for MLS purposes.

Career statistics

International
Source:

Belgium score listed first, score column indicates score after each Ciman goal.

Honours
Club Brugge
 Bruges Matins: 2009

Standard Liège
 Belgian Cup: 2010–11

Montreal Impact
 CONCACAF Champions League: Runner-up 2014–15

Toronto FC
 MLS Eastern Conference: 2019
 MLS Cup: Runner-up 2019

Individual
 MLS All-Star: 2015, 2016, 2018
 MLS Defender of the Year: 2015

References

External links

 Guardian Football

1985 births
Living people
People from Farciennes
Footballers from Hainaut (province)
Belgian footballers
Association football defenders
R. Charleroi S.C. players
Club Brugge KV players
K.V. Kortrijk players
Standard Liège players
CF Montréal players
Los Angeles FC players
Dijon FCO players
Toronto FC players
Belgian Pro League players
Major League Soccer players
Major League Soccer All-Stars
Ligue 1 players
Belgium under-21 international footballers
Olympic footballers of Belgium
Belgium international footballers
Footballers at the 2008 Summer Olympics
2014 FIFA World Cup players
UEFA Euro 2016 players
Belgian expatriate footballers
Belgian expatriate sportspeople in Canada
Belgian expatriate sportspeople in the United States
Belgian expatriate sportspeople in France
Expatriate soccer players in Canada
Expatriate soccer players in the United States
Expatriate footballers in France
Association football coaches
CF Montréal non-playing staff